Prafull Shiledar (born 1962) is an Indian Marathi language poet resides in Mumbai in India. He holds degrees in Sciences, Marathi literature and English Literature. He writes poetry in Marathi – a language in Central India spoken by about 120 million people. His published poetry books are Swagat (A Monologue) (1993) and Jaganyachya Pasaryat (In the disarray of living) (2006) and many uncollected poems. His poems are translated in many Indian languages and in English. His poems are published in National and International journals and anthologies. He has read poetry in many National literature festivals.

He was the poet of honor for Republic Day National Convention of Poets 2013 and his poem was translated in All Indian languages (22 languages) and was broadcast over the Nation by all radio stations of the Nation on eve of Republic Day of India.

Along with poetry writing, he has written short stories, book reviews, reports, features, film appreciations, music appreciation, interviews, travelogue and criticism on contemporary Marathi Poetry.

He is a translator and mainly translates poetry in his language-Marathi. Besides three published books of translations, he has translated Indian, American and Polish poetry in Marathi. His translation books include Jastiche Nahi (No Extras) (Translations of poems by Vinod Kumar Shukla –Indian Poet- 2013), Sanshayatma (Disbeliever) (Translation of poems by Gyanendra Pati- Indian Poet - 2013), Pul Nasleli Nadi( River without bridge) (Translation of short stories by Manasi- Indian writer – 2009).

He has participated for poetry reading in 11th Ars Poetica International Poetry Festival, Bratislava, Slovakia and 2nd International Marathi Literature Festival, Dubai, UAE. He read poetry in Poets Anonymous, USA, Poetry Society of Virginia, USA and Charles University, Prague.

He is recipient of Translation Award for 2009 by Gandhi Memorial Trust, Nagpur, India, ‘Vishakha’ Award for the book of Poems - ‘Swagat’ (A Monologue)(1993), ‘Keshawsut’ Award for best poetry book of the year (2006) by The State of Maharashtra for the poetry book ‘Jagnyachya Pasaryat’(In the disarray of living) and ‘Sharadchandra Muktibodh’ Award for the same book. Balshastri Jambhekar Translation Award(2014) for ‘Sanshayatma’. He has co edited literary journal ‘Yugavani’.

See also 
 Marathi poetry

References

1962 births
Marathi-language writers
Indian male poets
Indian male screenwriters
Living people
Writers from Mumbai
20th-century Indian poets
20th-century Indian male writers
http://sahitya-akademi.gov.in/awards/anuvad_samman_suchi.jsp#MARATHI